Warrington Wilderspool railway station served the town of Warrington, historically in Lancashire, England, from 1853 to 1871 on the Warrington and Stockport Railway.

History
The station was opened on 1 November 1853 by the Warrington and Stockport Railway. It was situated on the east side of Wilderspool Causeway bridge. It was a temporary station that was intended to be used until the Mersey bridge was completed. It was completed on 1 May 1854 and  opened on the same day. The station closed on this day but it reopened on 16 November 1868 as a ticket platform.  also opened on this day. It was decided that the distance between the two stations meant that Wilderspool wasn't sustainable so it closed on 1 October 1871 when Warrington Arpley reopened.

References

Disused railway stations in Cheshire
Railway stations in Great Britain opened in 1853
Railway stations in Great Britain closed in 1871
1853 establishments in England
1871 disestablishments in England